Jaime Baldeón (born 25 February 1959) is an Ecuadorian footballer. He played in 21 matches for the Ecuador national football team from 1981 to 1987. He was also part of Ecuador's squad for the 1987 Copa América tournament.

References

1959 births
Living people
Ecuadorian footballers
Ecuador international footballers
Association football forwards
People from Pichincha Province